The 1963 Hardin–Simmons Cowboys football team was an American football team that represented Hardin–Simmons University as an independent during the 1963 NCAA College Division football season. In its first and only season under head coach Floyd Huggins, the team compiled a 2–6–1 record. The Cowboys game against Arlington State scheduled for November 23 at Memorial Stadium was canceled in deference to the assassination of John F. Kennedy which occurred the previous day at Dallas.

From 1960 to 1963, the Hardin–Simmons football program compiled a combined record of 3–35–1 and was outscored by a total of 999 to 313. In January 1964, the university trustees ordered the elimination of the university football program. The chairman of the board said the move was necessitated by "financial difficulties and losses" in the athletic program. The school did not field another football team for 27 years.

Schedule

References

Hardin-Simmons
Hardin–Simmons Cowboys football seasons
Hardin-Simmons Cowboys football